(Trimethylsilyl)methyl chloride is the organosilicon compound with the formula (CH3)3SiCH2Cl.  A colorless, volatile liquid, it is an alkylating agent that is employed in organic synthesis, especially as a precursor to (trimethylsilyl)methyllithium.  In the presence of triphenylphosphine, it olefinates benzophenones:

See also
 Trimethylsilyl chloride, a silyl chloride

References

Organosilicon compounds